Sodoma's Ghost is an Italian direct-to-video horror film directed by Lucio Fulci.

Plot
At an isolated country house during World War II, a group of AWOL Nazi soldiers indulge in orgiastic behavior with a few prostitutes. One young, Aryan-blond soldier films the cavorting with a movie camera. While viewing the film, the Germans revels are brought to a sudden end when Allied bombs land on the villa, destroying it.

Present day. Six teenagers are driving to Paris after a touring holiday in the countryside. They are the van driver Mark, his friends Paul, John, Anne, Celine, and Maria. Driving off the main road, the group descends on the house seen in the prologue. Finding the villa abandoned, they break in through the back door and elect to stay for the night. The place is plush, fully furnished, and dotted with erotic paintings and photographs. It's also haunted by the ghosts of the same sex-crazed Nazis. That night, Willy the young Nazi soldier who had been filming the orgy seen earlier, emerges from a mirror and seduces Anne as she sleeps alone in a room. Anne responds to his violent sexual overtures. When she wakes up the following day, she discovers she's unmarked and assumes it was all a bad dream.

The six teenagers attempt to leave the next day, but their one attempt to drive away is thwarted when the route leads mysteriously back to the villa. Returning inside, they loiter around until dusk, finally deciding to stay again for another night. The next morning, they decide to try to leave again, only this time their vehicle won't start. They go back inside to phone for help. They are met with sinister responses over the phone by the police station as they attempt to call. Then, they discover that the phone line was cut all this time. What's more, they are locked in the house. The window shutters resist their efforts to break through, plus all the doors are locked shut too. Claustrophobic attacks happen when Maria begins to lose her sanity. Soon, bitter arguments occur between the three guys. Mark gets drunk on the vintage wine found in the cellar. After obnoxiously taunting Maria, he wanders off to explore more of the house.

Mark enters a room and finds a group of Nazi playing cards around a table. They invite the inebriated youth to join them. The others disappear, and Mark plays Russian roulette with Willy by playing a five-hand of cards with him, being forced to put the revolver to his head and pull the trigger three times with a single bullet in it. Mark survives the game and gets his reward: an assignation with a prostitute in a neighboring room. His desire turns to horror when his hands go right through her body and into a bloody pulp. Running out of the room, Mark sees Paul on the stairs and sees him transform into a Nazi too. Mark lunges at Paul, in which Mark falls down the stairs and breaks his neck. The others drag him into the living room, where he dies right before their eyes.

More supernatural occurrences occur, starting when Maria retreats to a room where a ghost prostitute attempts to seduce her and tries to sow seeds of anxiety in her by saying that her lover, Anne, is cheating on her with Celine. Paul then gets approached and seduced by a possessed Anne, who turns into a rotting corpse. Exploring for a way out, Paul and John find a can of film in the cellar, which apparently holds the key to the ghosts power. As Mark's corpse rots before their eyes, they hear footsteps of the approaching Nazi ghosts. The four surviving teens flee into the parlor, where they decide to play the film to find the mystery of the supernatural occurrences. The film is the orgy sequence, which the ghosts attempt to break down the door. Just when the ghosts break down the door, the film ends with the explosion that killed the Nazis. The marauding ghosts disappear, and the youths black out from the massive explosion that rocks the entire building. When they wake up, they all find themselves outside the now-ruined shell of the villa. Their experiences have apparently been nothing more than dreams, and the teens are relieved to discover that Mark is alive after all. Having enough of their adventures, the six teens pack up in their car and drive off.

Production

Pre-production
By the second half of the 1980s, Italian cinema was finding it more difficult to get theatrical distribution. As films released to home video did not need to be sent to the rating board for a theatrical screening certificate, some productions including Sodoma's Ghost saved money by releasing films direct-to-video. The film was part of a series titled I maestri del thriller that was aimed directly at television and home video release. Producer Carlo Alberto Alfieri presented the project to Luciano Martino who rejected it, and later made a deal with August Caminito's Scena International. Caminito's company then contacted Distribuzione Alpha Cinematographica and Cine Duck and sold television rights to the series to Reteitalia.

Cinematographer Silvano Tessicini got director Lucio Fulci involved in the series. Fulci had just returned from the Philippines after shooting Zombi 3 and was ill. Tessicini initially suggested Fulci to be part of the production as a supervisor, but Fulci directed two features: Touch of Death and Sodoma's Ghost. One of the directors had originally backed out of the series, which led to Fulci directing Sodoma's Ghost based on a script written by Fulci and Carlo Alberto Alfieri years before.

Filming
Filming began on May 30, 1988 and lasted for four weeks.  The film was shot around Rome and Vides Studios. Fulci later spoke negatively about both films stating that there were so many shots in the film to get the minimum running time of the films complete. Fulci also argued with the producers on set while the producers were unhappy with him as Fulci was continuously behind schedule. Actress Teresa Razzaudi also argued with Fulci because she refused to do nude scenes. This led to nude scenes where her character is seduced by a Nazi ghost being shot with a body double.

Fulci later referred to Sodoma's Ghost as his worst film and claimed he left the set leaving Mario Bianchi to finish the film. Bianchi stated he was asked by Fulci to shoot some connecting scenes for him which led to Binachi directing what he described not "half the film, but almost" Michele De Angeles later stated that Bianchi was only on the set for a few days and could not have shot that much material.

Critical reception
Cult Reviews said, "The problem with this movie is it’s just not sleazy enough. So, a sleazy Nazi film without sleaze? Yep, that’s all we have here. While it’s not entirely true that there’s no sleaze as actresses like to shuck their clothes to show us their very modest endowments – though most are small enough that it seems like Fulci did his casting calls at junior high schools – there’s no eroticism or sizzle with the sleaze. It just plain doesn’t feel sexy or even dirty."

Varied Celluoid said, "Chances are if you’re a decent horror fan, you have seen most of what The Ghosts of Sodom can offer you. However, if you are a big fan of Lucio Fulci’s, then you’ll probably track this one down no matter what I say."

J.C. Maçek III of WorldsGreatestCritic.com wrote, "I can just see ol' Lucio Fulci (who both directed and co-wrote this mess) sitting down in front of the Sylvania Super Set with a legal pad and watching the syndicated re-runs of The New Scooby-Doo Mysteries and taking copious notes while saying things like 'This show is great! The only thing missing are NAKED LESBIANS!'"

Footnotes

Sources

External links

Italian horror films
Films directed by Lucio Fulci
Films scored by Carlo Maria Cordio
Films shot in Italy
Direct-to-video horror films
Films shot in Rome